Santiago Marraco Solana (Canfranc, Spain, 25 July 1938) is a Spanish politician who belongs to the Spanish Socialist Workers' Party (PSOE) and who previously served as President of the Government of Aragon, one of the Spanish regional administrations, from 1983 to 1987.

References

1938 births
Living people
Presidents of the Government of Aragon
Members of the 1st Congress of Deputies (Spain)
Members of the 2nd Congress of Deputies (Spain)
Spanish Socialist Workers' Party politicians
Members of the Cortes of Aragon